This is the list of the members of the European Parliament for Greece in the 1984 to 1989 session. See 1984 European Parliament election in Greece for election results.

List

References

Greece
List
1984